Russin is a municipality in the canton of Geneva, Switzerland.

Russin may also refer to:

 Russin (surname)
 Alternate transliteration for Rusyn

See also
 Rusin (disambiguation)
 Russian (disambiguation)